Shams Last Stand is a live and compilation album by Sham 69 and Sham Pistols, was recorded in 1977–1979 at Rainbow Theatre, London, England. It was released as live album in 1989 and on 24 August 1999 as compilation album. The tracks includes "Pretty Vacant" by Sex Pistols and "White Riot" by The Clash was later featured on compilation album and was covered by Sham 69.

Track listing 
"What Have We Got" - 1:24
"I Don't Wanna" - 1:43
"They Don't Understand" - 1:54
"Angels with Dirty Faces" - 2:03
"Tell Us The Truth" - 2:44
"That's Life" - 2:25
"Rip Off" - 2:28
"Voices" - 2:11
"Borstal Breakout" - 2:57
"Pretty Vacant - 3:11 (Paul Cook, Steve Jones, Glen Matlock, Johnny Rotten)
"White Riot" - 3:26 (Mick Jones, Joe Strummer)
"If the Kids Are United" - 2:31
"What Have We Got" - 3:56
"Hurry Up Harry" - 2:32
"Hersham Boys" - 2:33
"Questions and Answers" - 3:27

Personnel 
Sham 69
 Jimmy Pursey - vocals
 Dave Guy Parsons - guitar
 Dave Tregunna - bass guitar
 Mark Cain - drums
Sham Pistols
 Jimmy Pursey - vocals
 Steve Jones - guitar
 Dave Guy Parsons - guitar
 Dave Tregunna - bass guitar
 Paul Cook - drums
 Mark Cain - backing vocals
 Ricky Goldstein - backing vocals

References 

Sham 69 live albums
Sham 69 compilation albums
1989 live albums
1999 compilation albums
Snapper Music albums
Snapper Music compilation albums